Mikhail   Ksenofontovich Sokolov (1885-1947) was a Russian painter, graphic artist and illustrator active in Soviet Avant-garde arts activity.

Biography
From 1904 to 1907 Sokolov studied at the Stroganov Moscow State Academy of Arts and Industry. He then spent two years in the Imperial Baltic Fleet. His first exhibition was through participation in the Mir iskusstva (World of Art) exhibition of 1917. This showed the influence of the French art from the late 19th and early 20th century.

Sokolov taught at the studios in Tver (1920-1922) whilst also taking on graphic work.  This included work for Тверской издательство (Tver Publishing House), which was privatised following the introduction of the New Economic Policy.

Prior to 1938, he worked as a teacher at various places including the Institute of Advanced Training of Artists and Designers. However in 1938, Sokolov put on trial and  sentenced in march to seven years in Siberian  labour camps. He was released early in 1943 owing to sickness and settled in Rybinsk.

Gallery

Personal life
He was married three times. On Nadezhda Shtemberg from 1917 to 1919, on Marina Baskakova from 1927 to 1935, on Nadezhda Vereshchagina-Rozanova in 1947.

References

External links
 «Он был предельно самоуверен. Это создавало ему много врагов»

1885 births
People from Yaroslavl
1947 deaths
Soviet painters
20th-century Russian painters
Gulag detainees
Deaths from stomach cancer
Russian printmakers
Soviet printmakers
Burials at Pyatnitskoye Cemetery
Deaths from cancer in Russia
Russian illustrators
Russian avant-garde
Stroganov Moscow State Academy of Arts and Industry alumni